The New City Condominiums (also called The Condos, Heritage Dr., The New City Condos, or simply Heritage) is a working to middle class residential neighborhood near the center of New City, New York, the county seat of Rockland County. The neighborhood takes up the entire street of Heritage Drive, and consists almost entirely of townhouses that were built in the 1970s.

Amenities
Basketball Courts,
Tennis Courts,
Handball Courts,
Swimming Pool,
Clubhouse,
Playground

Community
A working to middle-class neighborhood, the New City Condominiums consists almost entirely of townhouses, usually in sets of 6–12. This gives it a high population density compared to most New City neighborhoods, making it a very social community. It is known as being the most diverse neighborhood in New City, with many Russian Americans, African Americans, Hispanic Americans, Irish Americans, Italian Americans, Haitian Americans, Asian Americans, and Jewish Americans that live in the area, as well as people of other ethnic backgrounds. The ethnic diversity of the neighborhood gives it a melting pot feel. Being located right behind the New City Library, a few blocks down from many shopping centers on North Main St, and less than a mile north of the downtown area, make it a walkable neighborhood.

Education
The neighborhood is served by Clarkstown Central School District. Most students that reside in The Condos attend New City and Woodglen Elementary, Felix Festa Middle School, and Clarkstown High Schools North and South.

Notable people from The Condos
Keith Bulluck: NFL football player; grew up in The Condos.
Adam Rodriguez: Actor, one of the stars of CSI: Miami; grew up in The Condos.

See also
Clarkstown, New York

Neighborhoods in New York (state)
Buildings and structures in Rockland County, New York
Populated places in Rockland County, New York